Fly ball may refer to:

 Fly ball (baseball), a baseball term
 Fly ball governor, see centrifugal governor
 Flyball, a dog sport